Gautby is a village in the East Lindsey district of Lincolnshire, England.

Gautby parish church is dedicated to All Saints, and is a Grade II* listed building, rebuilt in 1754 of red brick, incorporating some medieval work by Robert Vyner of Gautby Park as a family chapel. Inside, there are two reclining stone figure English church monuments: on the north side, Thomas Vyner, and on the south, Sir Thomas Vyner, former lord mayor of london. Originally in St Mary Woolnoth church, London, they were both erected 1672, and moved by Sir Robert Vyner when Gautby church was rebuilt. A further memorial, an incised slab, records the murder of Frederick G. Vyner by Greek brigands in 1870.

Gautby Hall, the ancient seat of the Vyner family, was destroyed in 1874. Set in Gautby Great Park it was, according to Pevsner, probably designed by Matthew Brettingham; the park has returned to arable land but the hall's stables and lake with island still remain. On the island was an equestrian statue of Charles I "trampling on a prostrate foe", recorded by Kelly's Directory in 1885. Pevsner relates that this statue by Jasper Latham is now at Newby Hall, North Yorkshire.

There are two possible deserted medieval villages west of Gautby; Little Minting, and Thorley. However, no earthworks have been found.

References

External links

Gautby Heraldry
Parish Council

Villages in Lincolnshire
Civil parishes in Lincolnshire
East Lindsey District